Pečarovci (in older sources also Sveti Sebeštjan, Prekmurje Slovene: Püčarovci) is a village in the Municipality of Puconci in the Prekmurje region of Slovenia.

There are two churches in the settlement. The Roman Catholic parish church is dedicated to Saint Sebastian and was built in 1824. It has a single nave with a polygonal apse and a belfry on its eastern side. It belongs to the Diocese of Murska Sobota. The second church is a Lutheran church built north of the main settlement in the hamlet of Gorenšček.

Notable people
Notable people that were born or lived in Pečarovci include:
Mihály Bertalanits (1788–1853), poet and teacher
József Klekl (1874–1948), politician
Iván Persa (1861–1935), writer

References

External links
Pečarovci on Geopedia

Populated places in the Municipality of Puconci